Taking Dawn (earlier Devils Run) is a heavy metal band from Las Vegas, Nevada.

History

The band was originally named 7th Son in tribute to the iconic Iron Maiden album Seventh Son of a Seventh Son before calling themselves Taking Dawn.

The band signed to major American record label Roadrunner Records in 2009. Taking Dawn toured throughout 2010 and performed alongside Airbourne, Kiss, Slash, Trivium, All That Remains, Halestorm, DragonForce and Theory of a Deadman among others. Taking Dawn also performed at many festivals including Download in Europe and Soundwave in Australia.

In late 2010, drummer Alan Doucette left the band due to trouble on the road and was replaced by Carlo Mazzone. In 2013, guitarist Mikey Cross announced on his personal Facebook account that the band was finished and its members were all pursuing different musical ventures, however this was not acknowledged nor corroborated by the rest of the band.

Taking Dawn has since re-branded themselves under the new moniker Devils Run and released a number of new songs including "Burn the Night Out" and "Secrets".

In 2017, the band was returned to its former name Taking Dawn and released a new single "I Love Las Vegas".

Members

Current members
Chris Babbitt – lead vocals, lead guitar (2007–present)
Andrew Cushing – bass guitar, backing vocals (2007–present)
Steven Anderson - lead guitar, backing vocals
Duniel Puente - drums
Former members
Alan Doucette – drums (2007–2010) 
Carlo Mazzone - drums (2010-2011)
Tim D'Onofrio – drums (2012–2012)
Mikey Cross – guitar, backing vocals (2007–2013)

Discography

Albums
 2010 - Time to Burn 
 2020 - Dawn of the Demos

EPs
 2009 - Taking Dawn Digital EP
 2014 - ...in the Details (as Devils Run)
 2016 - ...In the Pale Moon Light (as Devils Run)

Compilations
 2010 - God of War: Blood & Metal - "This is Madness"

Singles
 2017 - The Devil Dared Me To (as Devils Run)
 2017 - I Love Las Vegas
 2018 - Just a Taste
 2019 - The Way You Bleed
 2022 - Full Throttle

Music videos
 2009 - Time to Burn
 2010 - The Chain
 2021 - Free

References

External links
Devils Run official Facebook page
Devils Run - free listening on SoundCloud

Heavy metal musical groups from Nevada
Musical groups established in 2007